Art Pop is the third release and second full-length album by the British rock band Githead, issued in 2007.

Track listing 
 "On Your Own" – 3:08
 "Drop" – 4:41
 "Drive By" – 3:42
 "Lifeloops" – 3:17
 "These Days" – 3:58
 "Jet Ear Game" – 4:10
 "Space Life" – 5:31
 "All Set Up" – 4:30
 "Darkest Star" – 5:05
 "Rotterdam" – 3:34
 "Live In Your Head" – 7:42

Personnel 
 Colin Newman - vocals, guitar
 Malka Spigel - bass, vocals
 Max Franken - drums
 Robin Rimbaud - guitar

References 

2007 albums
Githead albums
Swim (record label) albums